Bohumil Rameš (4 March 1895 – 26 November 1974) was a Czech cyclist. He competed for Bohemia at the 1912 Summer Olympics and for Czechoslovakia at the 1920 Summer Olympics.

References

External links
 

1895 births
1974 deaths
Czech male cyclists
Olympic cyclists of Bohemia
Olympic cyclists of Czechoslovakia
Cyclists at the 1912 Summer Olympics
Cyclists at the 1920 Summer Olympics
People from Mělník
Sportspeople from the Central Bohemian Region